Zilber is a variation of Silber and may refer to:
 Ariel Zilber (אריאל זילבר), Israeli musical artist
 Belu Zilber, Romanian communist activist
 Boris Zilber, see Zariski geometry and Cherlin–Zilber conjecture
 Irina Zilber, athlete
 J. A. Zilber, mathematician, known for the Eilenberg–Zilber theorem
 Maurice Zilber
 Michael Zilber
 Yitzchok Zilber, rabbi
 Lev Aleksandrovich Zilber, Soviet micro-biologist, virologist, and immunologist

Jewish surnames
Yiddish-language surnames